is a Japanese storyboard artist and director. He is also known by the moniker QZo, such as when he directed the anime television series Myself ; Yourself.

Anime involved in
Kyouran Kazoku Nikki: Director
Angel's Feather: Director
Burn Up W: Supervision
Chocotto Sister: Director
Full Metal Panic!: Episode Director (Eps. 2, 8, 21)
Fushigi Yuugi: Episode Director (eps 25, 34, 41)
Gloria: Director
Guardian Hearts: Director, Storyboard (OP), Episode Director (ep 6)
Guardian Hearts Power Up!: Director
Kämpfer: Director
Myself ; Yourself: Director (as QZo)
 Nakaimo – My Sister Is Among Them!: Producer
Saber Marionette J to X: Episode Director (eps 3, 7)
Shadow Skill 2: Series director
Speed Grapher: Episode Director (ep 5)
The Swiss Family Robinson: Flone of the Mysterious Island: Storyboard, Episode Director
Tenchi Universe: Episode Director (eps 5,10,16,22)

External links

 Yasuhiro Kuroda at Media Arts Database 

Anime directors
Living people
Year of birth missing (living people)